The Skyline Stakes is an Australian Turf Club Group 2 Thoroughbred horse race for colts and geldings aged two years old, at set weights, over a distance of 1,200 metres. It is held annually at Randwick Racecourse in Sydney, Australia in late February or early March.

The winner of this race receives automatic entry to the Golden Slipper Stakes and the race is considered an important prep test due to the same distance as the Golden Slipper Stakes.

History

The race is named in honour of Skyline, winner of the 1958 Golden Slipper Stakes and 1958 AJC Australian Derby.

The following thoroughbreds have completed the Skyline – Golden Slipper double:
Sir Dapper (1983), Star Watch (1988), Guineas (1997), Prowl (1998) and Dance Hero (2004)

Venue
 Before 1995 - Canterbury Park Racecourse
 1996–1999 - Rosehill Gardens Racecourse
 2000–2005 - Canterbury Park Racecourse
 2006–2010 - Randwick Racecourse
 2011 - Warwick Farm Racecourse
 2012 - Randwick Racecourse
 2013 - Warwick Farm Racecourse
 2014 - Randwick Racecourse
 2015 - Warwick Farm Racecourse
 2016 onwards - Randwick Racecourse

Grade

 1979 - Principal Race
 1980–1986 - Listed Race
 1987–2012 - Group 3
 2013 onwards -  Group 2

Winners

 2023 - Corniche
 2022 - Promitto
 2021 - O'President
 2020 - Mamaragan
 2019 - Microphone
 2018 - Santos
 2017 - Diamond Tathagata
 2016 - Good Standing 
 2015 - Exosphere 
 2014 - Valentia
 2013 - All The Talk
 2012 - Ashokan
 2011 - Uate
 2010 - Hinchinbrook
 2009 - Manhattan Rain
 2008 - All American
 2007 - Murtajill
 2006 - Casino Prince
 2005 - Snitzel
 2004 - Dance Hero
 2003 - Kusi
 2002 - Choisir
 2001 - Viscount
 2000 - Kootoomootoo
 1999 - Shogun Lodge
 1998 - Prowl
 1997 - Guineas
 1996 - Excel Pilot
 1995 - Strategic
 1994 - Dr. Zackary
 1993 - Allez Glen
 1992 - Kenfair
 1991 - Big Dreams
 1990 - Our Horizon
 1989 - Show County
 1988 - Star Watch
 1987 - Proven Valour
 1986 - Pre Catelan
 1985 - Timothy
 1984 - Hula Drum
 1983 - Sir Dapper
 1982 - Hot Opera
 1981 - Domino
 1980 - Cosmic Delight
 1979 - Top Hat Joe

See also
 List of Australian Group races
 Group races

External links 
First three placegetters Skyline Stakes (ATC)

References

Horse races in Australia